This is a list of some of the most notable films produced in Cinema of Germany in the 2010s.

For an alphabetical list of articles on German films, see :Category:2010s German films.

2010

2011

2012

2013

2014
List of German films of 2014

2015

2016

2017

2018

2019

References

2010s
Lists of 2010s films
Films